Choeradodis rhombicollis, or Peruvian shield mantis, is a species of praying mantis native to North America, Central America, and South America.  It is found in Belize, Costa Rica, Ecuador, French Guiana, Guatemala, Colombia, Mexico, Nicaragua, Panama, Peru, and Suriname.

Behaviour
The species can resemble both living and dead leaves. In either case, they choose a position beside a leaf that they resemble. To further enhance their camouflage, when disturbed, they can gently vibrate - mimicking the motion of the wind over a leaf. To catch prey, they use a "sit and wait" strategy, feeding on a large variety of arthropods. Larger individuals have been observed catching and consuming prey such as lizards and even hummingbirds.

See also
List of mantis genera and species

References

Mantidae
Mantodea of North America
Mantodea of South America
Insects of Central America
Arthropods of Colombia
Fauna of Ecuador
Insects of Mexico
Fauna of Peru
Insects described in 1833
Insects of South America